The 1988 SCCA Escort Trans-Am Championship was the 23rd running of the Sports Car Club of America's premier series. 1988 would mark the end of the "GT era", in which the series had been the support series, and often the lesser classes, of the more popular IMSA GT Championship, which had overtaken Trans Am as the most popular road racing series in the United States beginning in 1973 after the decline of muscle cars and the 1973 Oil Crisis. This led to an increase in competitiveness from foreign manufacturers.

The Audi 200 quattro won the manufacturer's championship and Hurley Haywood won the driver's championship.

Results

Championship standings (Top 20)

References

Trans-Am Series
Trans-Am